The 10th Politburo of the Communist Party of Vietnam (CPV), formally the 10th Political Bureau of the Central Committee of the Communist Party of Vietnam (Vietnamese: Bộ Chính trị Ban Chấp hành trung ương Đảng Cộng sản Việt Nam Khoá X), was elected at the 1st Plenary Session of the 10th Central Committee in the immediate aftermath of the 10th National Congress.

Members

References

Bibliography
 Chân dung 19 ủy viên Bộ Chính trị khóa XII

10th Politburo of the Communist Party of Vietnam